Point Commerce is an unincorporated community in Jefferson Township, Greene County, Indiana. It is part of the Bloomington, Indiana, Metropolitan Statistical Area.

History
Point Commerce was so named in anticipation that two canals would meet at that point. A post office was established at Point Commerce in 1837, and remained in operation until it was discontinued in 1869.

Geography
Point Commerce is located along the banks of the Eel River, near its confluence with the White River. The nearby town of Worthington is situated directly across the Eel River from Point Commerce.

Demographics

Point Commerce was never separately returned in a U.S. Census. However, the final report for the Census of 1850 provided a population estimate of 237 for the community.

References

Unincorporated communities in Greene County, Indiana
Unincorporated communities in Indiana
Bloomington metropolitan area, Indiana